Bernhard Rudolf Britz (27 March 1906 – 31 May 1935) was a Swedish road racing cyclist who won bronze medals in the individual and team road races at the 1932 Summer Olympics. Between 1927 and 1933 he won nine national titles, three individual and six in teams. He was also an innovator and developed a bicycle gear, though without much commercial success.

He died after a collision with a truck in a cycling race in 1935.

References

1906 births
1935 deaths
Swedish male cyclists
Olympic cyclists of Sweden
Cyclists at the 1932 Summer Olympics
Olympic bronze medalists for Sweden
Olympic medalists in cycling
People from Mjölby Municipality
Medalists at the 1932 Summer Olympics
Sport deaths in Sweden
Cyclists who died while racing
Sportspeople from Östergötland County
20th-century Swedish people